The electoral district of Port Fairy and Glenelg was an electorate of the Victorian Legislative Assembly in the Australian state of Victoria. Created in 1927 by the amalgamation of Port Fairy and Glenelg, Ernie Bond was the last member for Glenelg and the first for Port Fairy and Glenelg. The electorate was abolished in 1945.

Members for Port Fairy and Glenelg

Election results

References

Former electoral districts of Victoria (Australia)
1927 establishments in Australia
1945 disestablishments in Australia